Group B of UEFA Women's Euro 2022 was played from 8 to 16 July 2022. The pool was made up of Germany, Denmark, Spain and Finland.

Teams

Notes

Standings

Matches

Spain vs Finland

Germany vs Denmark

Denmark vs Finland

Germany vs Spain

Finland vs Germany

Denmark vs Spain

Discipline
Fair play points will be used as tiebreakers in the group if the overall and head-to-head records of teams were tied. These are calculated based on yellow and red cards received in all group matches as follows:

 first yellow card: minus 1 point;
 indirect red card (second yellow card): minus 3 points;
 direct red card: minus 4 points;
 yellow card and direct red card: minus 5 points;

References

External links

Group B